A younger brother is a male individual who has at least one older sibling.

Younger brother or variants may also refer to:
Younger Brother, British music group
Younger Brother, a term used by a native community of northern Colombia known as the Koguis
Younger Brethren, a group within the British organisation Trinity House
 Younger Brother (film), a 1953 Spanish drama film

See also
 Younger Brothers (disambiguation)
Junior Brother, Irish folk singer